Deserticossus artemisiae is a moth in the family Cossidae. It is found in China (Inner Mongolia, Shansi).

References

External links
Natural History Museum Lepidoptera generic names catalog

Cossinae
Moths described in 1986
Moths of Asia